Reserved wild animals are the highest class of protection for animal species in Thailand's wildlife conservation framework. There are currently nineteen designated species, defined by The Wild Animal Conservation and Protection Act B.E. 2562 (2019). The 2019 act replaced the original law from 1992. The law prohibits hunting, breeding, possessing, or trading any of such species, except when done for scientific research with permission from the Permanent Secretary of National Park, Wildlife and Plant Conservation, or breeding and possession by authorised public zoos.
 
The twenty conserved wild animals are: 

Of these twenty species, the Schomburgk's deer is already extinct, and the Javan and Sumatran rhinoceros are locally extinct in Thailand.

In 1992, Indian hog deer (Axis porcinus) (เนื้อทราย), added in 1960, was removed from the list.

In the near future, Thailand will add Irrawaddy dolphin (Orcaella brevirostris) (โลมาหัวบาตร) as a reserved species  after only 14 of them were found in the latest survey of Songkhla Lake.

References

External links
.

Wildlife conservation in Thailand
Fauna of Thailand